36th Street may refer to:

36th Street station (BMT Fourth Avenue Line), a New York City Subway station in Brooklyn
36th Street station (IND Queens Boulevard Line), a New York City Subway station in Queens
36th Street station (BMT Fifth Avenue Line), a former New York City Subway station in Brooklyn
36th Street station (River Line), Camden, New Jersey
36th Street Portal, a SEPTA trolley station in Philadelphia
36th Street station (SEPTA), a SEPTA subway station in Philadelphia, Pennsylvania
Beach 36th Street station, a New York City Subway station also in Queens
36th Street station (Charlotte), a station in the Lynx Blue Line of Charlotte